Out of a Clear Sky is a lost 1918 American silent romantic drama film starring Marguerite Clark and directed by Marshall Neilan. Based upon a novel by Maria Thompson Daviess, Famous Players-Lasky produced the film and Paramount Pictures distributed.

Plot
As described in a film magazine, Celeste (Clark), Countess of Bersek et Krymm, a self-willed Belgian maiden, refuses to be used as a pawn of state to further the political ambitions of her scheming Uncle Dyreck (Ratcliffe), who has ordered her to marry a German prince. When he insists, Celeste slips away with her governess and steams to New York City. Uncle Dyreck follows and begs her to return to Belgium, but she refuses. She goes to Tennessee followed by her persistent relative, and ultimately finds herself alone and friendless in a mountain gorge. A prey to despair, she is discovered by Robert Lawrence (Meighan), a wealthy land owner, who promises to help her. Learning that Uncle Dyreck is in the vicinity, Robert leaves Celeste and seeks him out to throw him off the scent. In his absence, Celeste goes to a cabin and is prevailed upon by a boy to visit his granny in the mountains. They scarcely had left the cabin when it is hit by lightning and destroyed. On his return, Robert finds fragments of Celeste's dress and believes she died in the cabin. He finds her later, and tells her that he can rid her of her uncle by showing him the charred remains of her dress and saying that she died. Celeste approves of the plan and Uncle Dyreck gives up his search. Robert and Celeste plight their troth.

Cast
Marguerite Clark as Countess Celeste de Bersek et Krymm
Thomas Meighan as Robert Lawrence
E. J. Ratcliffe as Uncle Dyreck (credited as E. J. Radcliffe)
Bobby Connelly as Bill
Raymond Bloomer as Crown Prince
Robert Dudley as Father
Walter P. Lewis as Steve
Maggie Fisher as Granny White (credited as Maggie H. Fisher)
Helen Montrose as Jane Forsythe
Robert Vivian as Valet
Nell Clark Keller as Mamie
Mercedes de Cordoba as Uncredited

References

External links

Still (University of Washington, Sayre collection)
Daviess, Maria Thompson, Out of a Clear Sky; a Novel, New York: Harper & Brothers Publishers, 1917 edition, on the Internet Archive

1918 films
American silent feature films
Lost American films
Films directed by Marshall Neilan
Films based on American novels
Paramount Pictures films
1918 romantic drama films
American romantic drama films
American black-and-white films
1910s American films
Silent romantic drama films
Silent American drama films